Wunderman is a surname. Notable people with the surname include:

Lester Wunderman (1920–2019), American advertising executive
Michael Wunderman, American businessman and filmmaker

See also
Wunderman
Wunderman Thompson